The South West Peninsula League (SWPL) is a football competition in England, which was formed in 2007 from the merger of the Devon County League and the South Western League. The league is restricted to clubs based in Cornwall, Devon and West Dorset.

The league consists of two Premier Divisions (East and West), which are ranked at Step 6 in the National League System. Until 2019–20, there was a single Premier Division at Step 6, and two divisions at Step 7 (Division One West and Division One East).

Subject to applying, receiving the required ground grading and finishing high enough in the league table, one club from each Premier Division can be promoted to the Western League Premier Division each season. As of 2022, six clubs have been promoted from the league – Buckland Athletic after finishing as runners-up in 2012, Plymouth Parkway after finishing as champions in 2018, Tavistock and Exmouth Town who were first and second in 2019, and Falmouth Town and Torpoint Athletic who finished as division champions in 2022.

The bottom two clubs from each Premier Division can be relegated each season to the nearest feeder league. The feeder league for Premier Division West is the St Piran Football League. The feeder for Premier Division East is the Devon League.

The league's principal sponsor is Carlsberg. The League Cup competition is sponsored by Walter C Parson Funeral Directors and is called The Walter C Parson Cup.

Champions

Walter C Parson Cup Winners (formerly Throgmorton Cup)

2007–08 – Bodmin Town
2008–09 – Bodmin Town
2009–10 – Buckland Athletic
2010–11 – Plymouth Parkway
2011–12 – Bodmin Town – beating Buckland Athletic 6–5 on penalties (0–0 aet)
2012–13 – Bodmin Town
2013–14 – Plymouth Parkway
2014–15 – Godolphin Atlantic
2015–16 – Bodmin Town
2016–17 – St Austell
2017–18 – Falmouth Town
2018–19 – Saltash United
2019–20 – No winner; season abandoned
2020–21 – Not played
2021–22 – Torpoint Athletic

Member clubs
The constitutions of the two divisions for 2022–23 are:

References

External links
Official SWPL website
SWPL fixtures at The Herald

 
2
Sports leagues established in 2007
2007 establishments in England
Football leagues in England